The 2021 Budapest Formula 3 round was the fourth round of the 2021 FIA Formula 3 Championship. It took place at the Hungaroring and featured three races on the 31 July and 1 August in support of the 2021 Hungarian Grand Prix.

Classification

Qualifying

Sprint Race 1 

 Notes

  – Lorenzo Colombo originally finished the race in first, but due to him having driven more than ten car lengths behind the Safety Car prior to the car turning its lights out for the restart he received a five-second penalty, demoting him to seventh.
 – Arthur Leclerc was given a three-place grid penalty for the first race after causing a collision with Victor Martins and Clément Novalak at the previous race.
  – Frederik Vesti was given a three-place grid penalty for the first race after driving unnecessarily slowly between turns 12 and 14 in qualifying.

Sprint Race 2 

Notes

  – Jak Crawford was given a five-place grid drop due to him causing a collision with Ido Cohen in the first race, moving him to the back of the grid.
 – Johnathan Hoggard received a five-second penalty for forcing Tijmen van der Helm off the track.

Feature Race

Standings after the event 

Drivers' Championship standings

Teams' Championship standings

 Note: Only the top five positions are included for both sets of standings.

See also 
 2021 Hungarian Grand Prix

References 

|- style="text-align:center"
|width="35%"|Previous race:
|width="30%"|FIA Formula 3 Championship2021 season
|width="40%"|Next race:

2021 FIA Formula 3 Championship
Budapest Formula 3
Budapest Formula 3 round